Merestead, also known as the former Sloane Estate, is a historic home located at Mount Kisco, Westchester County, New York.

History
It was the country estate of William Douglas Sloane, president of W. & J. Sloane. It includes a neo-Georgian mansion completed in 1907.  It was designed by Delano and Aldrich and is a -story, rectangular mansion with open porches on the ends and a -story service wing.  Also on the property are 12 other contributing buildings:  a garden house (c. 1907), two garages (c. 1907), carriage house, (c. 1907), a tenant house (c. 1850), cow barn (c. 1907), stable (late 19th century), storage / playhouse building (early 20th century), and four small shed / outbuildings date to about 1900.

It was added to the National Register of Historic Places in 1984.

Current ownership
The 130-acre Merestead property, which included the 28-room mansion and art collection, was deeded to Westchester County by Margaret Sloane Patterson and Dr. Robert Lee Patterson Jr. in 1982.  The county took full possession of the property in 2002. The county recently approved a $2.05 million fund to repair the mansion.  Tours of the mansion are offered on a limited basis by appointment only.

See also
National Register of Historic Places listings in northern Westchester County, New York

References

External links
 Merestead - official site

Houses on the National Register of Historic Places in New York (state)
Georgian Revival architecture in New York (state)
Houses completed in 1907
Historic house museums in Westchester County, New York
Parks in Westchester County, New York
Mount Kisco, New York
National Register of Historic Places in Westchester County, New York